Blank Banshee 1 is the second studio album by Canadian musician and producer Blank Banshee. It was released as a free digital download via Bandcamp on October 20, 2013.

Background and composition
Production for Blank Banshee 1 began in late 2012 with tracks such as ‘Eco Zones’ appearing as early as February 2013. The album was announced officially through social media on September 22, 2013. The music video for "Infinite Login" was released preceding the album on October 19, 2013.

Blank Banshee 1 consists of 15 tracks, largely instrumental in nature. It was produced using an Akai APC40 and features heavy use of 808 drums and micro-samples sourced from video games, and early 2000s computer software. Themes of consumerist detachment and alienation appear throughout the album. Song titles such as “Infinite Login”, “Anxiety Online!” and “Cyber Slums” assert a juxtaposition of modern technology, angst and desolation. The album has been called Vaportrap and ‘Post-Internet’. It manifests a "future sound that can be ‘cold’ and digital-and even carry connotations of luxury and the virtual world".

Blank Banshee 1 was produced in Victoria, Canada.

The album artwork was designed by Blank Banshee and depicts a series of colored cubes in a triangular formation over a monochromatic gradient.

Blank Banshee 1 has been released on Cassette Tape, Compact Disc, Vinyl and USB Flash Drive independently through the online store Hologram Bay.

Paradise Disc
Paradise Disc is a series of 6 computer animated videos produced by Banshee, serving as the official music videos for Blank Banshee 1.

The series was released via YouTube between October 19, 2013 and January 1, 2014.

Reception

The Fader called Blank Banshee 1 "a masterwork of the new digital psychedelia" and a "definitive document of the Vaporwave era".

Music from the album has appeared in the Vice series Love Industries.

Track listing
Adapted from official liner notes.

Notes
 "Eco Zones" and "Cyberslums" feature vocals by Cormorant

References

External links
Blank Banshee 1 on Internet Archive

Vaporwave albums
2013 albums
Blank Banshee albums